The 1873 Birthday Honours were appointments by Queen Victoria to various orders and honours to reward and highlight good works by citizens of the British Empire. The appointments were made to celebrate the official birthday of the Queen, and were published in The London Gazette on 24 May 1873.

The recipients of honours are displayed here as they were styled before their new honour, and arranged by honour, with classes (Knight, Knight Grand Cross, etc.) and then divisions (Military, Civil, etc.) as appropriate.

United Kingdom and British Empire

The Most Honourable Order of the Bath

Knight Grand Cross of the Order of the Bath (GCB)

Military Division
Royal Navy
Admiral Sir Provo William Parry Wallis 
Admiral Sir William Fanshawe Martin 
Admiral Thomas, Earl of Lauderdale 
Admiral Sir Lewis Tobias Jones 

Army
General Sir Henry George Andrew Taylor 
General Sir George Bowles 
General Sir Abraham Roberts 
General Sir James Charles Chatterton 
General Sir William Henry Elliott 
Lieutenant-General Sir Sydney John Cotton 
Lieutenant-General Sir John Bloomfield 
Lieutenant-General Sir Duncan Alexander Cameron

Knight Commander of the Order of the Bath (KCB)

Military Division
Royal Navy
Admiral Henry Smith 
Admiral Sir Thomas Sabine Pasley 
Vice-Admiral George St. Vincent King 
Admiral Charles Eden 
Vice-Admiral the Honourable James Robert Drummond 
Rear-Admiral John Walter Tarleton 
Rear-Admiral Charles Frederick Alexander Shadwell 
Rear-Admiral Astley Cooper Key 

Army
Lieutenant-General Francis Warde
Lieutenant-General Frederick William Hamilton 
Lieutenant-General Arthur Mitford Becher 
Lieutenant-General Charles Trollope 
Lieutenant-General Edward Cooper Hodge 
Lieutenant-General the Honourable Alexander Hamilton-Gordon 
Lieutenant-General John Fordyce
Lieutenant-General Philip Melmoth Nelson Guy 
Major-General Lord Henry Hugh Manvers Percy
Major-General Charles Henry Ellice 
Major-General Richard Wilbraham 
Major-General James Duncan Macpherson 
Major-General Edmund Haythorne
Major-General Henry Drury Harness 
Major-General Henry Wylie Norman 
Colonel John Miller Adye 
Surgeon-General William Mure Muir

Companion of the Order of the Bath (CB)

Military Division
Royal Navy
Rear-Admiral Edwin Clayton Tennyson d'Eyncourt
Rear-Admiral Arthur Mellersh
Rear-Admiral Robert Coote
Captain Julian Foulston Slight
Captain Thomas Saumarez
Captain William Andrew James Heath
Captain Cornelius Thomas Augustus Noddall
Captain Robert Gibson
Captain Augustus Chetham Strode

Army
General Edward Armstrong, Madras Infantry
Lieutenant-General Maurice Barlow
Lieutenant-General Matthew Smith
Lieutenant-General Henry Bates
Lieutenant-General George Staunton
Lieutenant-General James Travers  Bengal Infantry
Major-General John Leslie Dennis
Major-General James Abbott, Royal (late Bengal) Artillery
Major-General John Stafford Paton, Bengal Staff Corps
Major-General Charles Elmhirst 
Major-General Sir James Edward Alexander 
Major-General Charles Arthur Barwell, Bengal Staff Corps
Major-General William Henry March, retired, Royal Marines
Colonel Charles Tyrwhitt
Colonel George Calvert Clarke, late 2nd Dragoons
Colonel Frederick Amelius Whimper
Colonel Edmund Augustus Whitmore
Colonel John Josiah Hort, Brigade Depot
Colonel James Croft Brooke, late 8th Regiment
Colonel Frederick Robert Elrington, Rifle Depot
Colonel Percy Archer Butler, late 28th Regiment
Colonel William Sankey, 62nd Regiment
Colonel Lord Augustus Charles Lennox FitzRoy
Colonel William James Loftus, late 38th Regiment
Colonel Henry Meade Hamilton, Brigade Depot
Colonel Michael Anthony Shrapnel Biddulph, Royal Artillery
Colonel Bartholomew O'Brien, Brigade Depot
Colonel Cadwallader Adams, 49th Regiment
Colonel Henry Hamilton Maxwell, Royal (late Bengal) Artillery
Colonel Robert White, Brigade Depot
Colonel Charles Edward Parke Gordon, late 75th Regiment
Colonel David Scott Dodgson, Bengal Infantry
Colonel William James Esten Grant, Royal Artillery
Colonel John Desborough, Royal Artillery
Colonel Robert Cadell, Royal (late Madras) Artillery
Colonel Charles Malcolm Barrow, Bombay Staff Corps
Colonel Alfred Bassano, late 82nd Regiment
Colonel Arthur Howlett, Madras Staff Corps
Colonel Frederick William Burroughs, 93rd Regiment
Colonel George Whittle Mackenzie Hall, Bengal Staff Corps
Colonel Peter Stark Lumsden  Bengal Staff Corps
Colonel Shurlock Henning, 38th Regiment
Colonel John Hamilton Cox, late 75th Regiment
Colonel Arthur Bunny, Royal (late Bengal) Artillery
Colonel Charles Butler Peter Nugent Hodges Nugent, Royal Engineers
Lieutenant-Colonel William John Williams, Royal Artillery
Lieutenant-Colonel John Irvine Murray, Bengal Staff Corps
Lieutenant-Colonel Robert Baigrie, Bombay Staff Corps
Lieutenant-Colonel Dominick Sarsfield Greene, Royal Artillery
Lieutenant-Colonel Frederick Richard Maunsell, Royal (late Bengal) Engineers
Inspector-General of Hospitals and Fleets John Rees  (retired)
Inspector-General of Hospitals Richard Dane 
Inspector-General of Hospitals Benjamin William Marlow 
Surgeon-Major John Wyatt, Coldstream Guards
Deputy Controller Randolph Routh
Deputy Controller Henry Bartlett
Deputy Controller Alexander Crowder Crookshank

The Most Exalted Order of the Star of India

Knight Grand Commander (GCSI)
His Excellency Maharajah Jung Bahadoor Kunwar Ranajee  Prime Minister of Nepal
General Sir John Low  Madras Infantry, formerly Political Resident at Lucknow and Hyderabad and Member of the Council of the Governor-General of India
Lieutenant-General Sir Neville Bowles Chamberlain  Bengal Infantry, late Commanding Punjab Irregular Force

Knight Commander (KCSI)
Nawab Khan Bahadoor Khwajah Muhammad Khan Khuttuk, of Kohat
George Campbell, Bengal Civil Service, Lieutenant-Governor of Bengal
Alexander John Arbuthnot  Madras Civil Service, late Member of the Council of the Governor of Madras
Major-General Harry Burnett Lumsden  Bengal Staff Corps, late Envoy to Candahar

Companion (CSI)
John Forbes David Inglis, Bengal Civil Service, Senior Member of the Board of Revenue, North-West Provinces, and additional Member of the Council of the Governor-General of India for making Laws and Regulations
Lieutenant-Colonel Alexander Campbell McNeill, late Madras Staff Corps, formerly Agent to the Governor-General in Orissa
John Ware Edgar, Bengal Civil Service, Deputy Commissioner, Cachar, late Political Officer attached to the Looshai Expeditionary Force

References

Birthday Honours
1873 awards
1873 in India
1873 in the United Kingdom